The short-tailed magpies are two species of magpies that used to be considered conspecific:

 Javan green magpie (Cissa thalassina) 
 Bornean green magpie (Cissa jefferyi)

Animal common name disambiguation pages